Stepnoy is a rural locality (a settlement) in Mukhorshibirsky District, Republic of Buryatia, Russia. The population was 113 as of 2010. There are 7 streets.

Geography 
Stepnoy is located 49 km northeast of Mukhorshibir (the district's administrative centre) by road. Tugnuy is the nearest rural locality.

References 

Rural localities in Mukhorshibirsky District